The 2013 Canadian Figure Skating Championships were held from January 13 to 20, 2013 at the Hershey Centre in Mississauga, Ontario. The event determined the national champions of Canada and was organized by Skate Canada, the nation's figure skating governing body. Medals were awarded in the disciplines of men's singles, women's singles, pair skating, and ice dancing on the senior, junior, and novice levels. Although the official International Skating Union terminology for female skaters in the singles category is ladies, Skate Canada uses women officially. The results of this competition are among the selection criteria for the 2013 World Championships, 2013 Four Continents Championships, and the 2013 World Junior Championships.

Overview
Patrick Chan won his sixth national title. Kevin Reynolds won the silver medal with a free skating that included a 4T, 4S, 4T+3T, and 3A+3T.

Kaetlyn Osmond won her first national title. Gabrielle Daleman and Alaine Chartrand joined her on the podium while the defending champion, Amelie Lacoste, finished just off the podium.

Meagan Duhamel / Eric Radford defended their title in a close race with Kirsten Moore-Towers / Dylan Moscovitch.

Tessa Virtue / Scott Moir won their fifth national title.

Police were called to break up a scuffle among a group of skaters after the event. A Skate Canada representative said no top skaters were involved.

Senior results

Men

Women

Pairs

Ice dancing

Junior results

Men

Women

Pairs

Ice dancing

Novice results

Men

Women

Pairs

Ice dancing

International team selections

Four Continents Championships
Skate Canada announced the Canadian team to the 2013 Four Continents Championships on January 20, 2013:

World Junior Championships
Skate Canada announced the Canadian team to the 2013 World Junior Championships on January 20, 2013:

World Championships
Skate Canada announced part of the Canadian team to the 2013 World Championships on January 21, 2013, leaving the third men's and ice dancing spots to be determined following Four Continents Championships. In February, 2013, Skate Canada announced that Andrei Rogozine took the third men's spot  and Kaitlyn Weaver and Andrew Poje took the third ice dancing spot of the Canadian world team roster.

World Team Trophy
Skate Canada announced part of the Canadian team to the 2013 World Team Trophy on March 26, 2013.

References

External links
 2013 Canadian Figure Skating Championships results
 Skate Canada

Canadian Figure Skating Championships
Figure skating
Figure skating
Canadian Figure Skating Championships
Sport in Mississauga
Canadian Figure Skating Championships